Romuli is a commune in Bistrița-Năsăud County, Transylvania, Romania. It is composed of two villages, Dealu Ștefăniței (Szalanca) and Romuli.

Notable people
Jacobo Langsner (1927-2020), Uruguayan playwright

Gallery

References

External links

Communes in Bistrița-Năsăud County
Localities in Transylvania